Sao Kawng Kiao Intaleng succeeded his brother to become the 53rd ruler (Sawbwa) of the Shan state of Kengtung in 1895.  He, his first wife, and his sister, Princess Tip Htila, all attended the Delhi Durbar in 1903 in a party of Shan princes guided by J. G. Scott. After this journey, in 1905, he built a new palace in Imperial Indian style at his capital, Kengtung. He was a popular and capable ruler, and abolished domestic slavery in the state. He died in 1935.

The Kengtung State Chronicle lists his six wives and nineteen children. The politician and scholar Sao Sāimöng was one of his sons.

Sources
Andrew Marshall, The Trouser People: a Story of Burma in the Shadow of the Empire. London: Penguin; Washington: Counterpoint, 2002. 
Sao Sāimöng Mangrāi, The Pādaeng Chronicle and the Jengtung State Chronicle Translated. University of Michigan, Ann Arbor, 1981. 

Burmese royalty
1874 births
1935 deaths
Kengtung State
Burmese people of Shan descent